Oh My General is a 2017 Chinese streaming television series starring Ma Sichun and Sheng Yilun. It is adapted from the novel General Above I Am Below by Ju Hua San Li. Set against the backdrop of the Song dynasty, the gender bender series tells the story of the marriage between a highly skilled female general and a prince of unrivaled beauty. The series aired on Youku starting 25 October 2017.

Synopsis
During the Song Dynasty, Ye Zhao becomes a soldier of outstanding ability. Only a select few outside Zhao's immediate family know that Zhao is actually female, having been disguised as a boy since childhood. She was dressed and taught like a boy to allow her to accompany, and eventually join, her family of warriors. When her father and brother died in an invasion, she took over control of the Ye army to defend her home, eventually receiving a top rank of general. The series begins with Zhao's promotion to general, and her true gender being revealed to the Imperial court soon after.

The Empress Dowager worries about Ye Zhao holding too much power, and uses the revelation of Zhao's gender to bethroth Ye Zhao to a nephew of the Emperor and force her to move to the capital to be controlled. Her fiancé is the Prince of Nanping, Zhao Yujin, who possesses remarkable beauty but is sickly, pampered, lazy and spends his time on "useless" artistic pursuits. Thus, the story of the real battle of who will take power in this new household begins.

Cast

Main
Ma Sichun as Ye Zhao
A woman warrior with supreme martial arts skills. Disguised as a man, she took her father's place in the army, then became an accomplished general. 
Sheng Yilun as Zhao Yujin
Emperor Renzong's nephew - a man who is known for his supreme beauty. Despite his good looks, he is spoiled, lazy, and weak; spending most of his time gambling and frequenting brothels with his hedonistic friends. After falling in love with Ye Zhao, Yujin slowly transforms himself into a strong and capable man.

Supporting

People around Ye Zhao
Ding Chuan as Hu Qing
Ye Zhao's military strategist who has been by her side since he was eighteen. He has a one-sided love for Ye Zhao. 
Wang Churan as Liu Xiyin
Ye Zhao's cousin. She has no idea that Ye Zhao is a female and has a one-sided love for her. Later on, she became the fiancé of the Crown Prince of Western Xia.
Lu Xingyu as Ye Zhong
Wang Li as Qiu Laohu
Wang Xuan as Qiu Hua
Pan Shiqi as Qiu Shui

People around Zhao Yujin
Zhang Jiayi as Zhang Gui 
Noble Consort Zhang's brother. Zhao Yujin's friend. 
Xiang Hao as Guo Yuanjing
The Empress's nephew. Zhao Yujin's friend. 
Yu Bo as Fan Zhongyan
A minister who is loyal to the country but is constantly slighted despite his earnest attitude. Zhao Yujin's good friend.
An Yongchang as Concubine Yang
Zhang Xinying as Meiniang
Zheng Shuhan as Xuaner
Zhang Zhilü as Xiao Xiazi
Zhao Yujin's study companion.

Imperial Family
Song Yunhao as Emperor Zhenzong 
Tien Niu as the Empress Dowager
Lu Fangsheng as the Emperor Renzong
Zhu Yongteng as the Prince of Qi
The Emperor's brother. The main antagonist of the series. He puts up a pretence in front of his brother, while plotting with the people of Western Xia to bring him down and usurp the throne. 
Xiao Han as Noble Consort Zhang
The Emperor's favoured consort.
Zhang Yao as the Princess Dowager of Zhao
Zhao Yujin's mother.
Zhang Wen as the Princess Consort of Zhao
Zhao Yujin's older sister-in-law
Chou Shuokang as Little Sparrow
The Prince of Qi's son.

Western Xia
Wang Ce as the King of Western Xia
Liu Dini as Empress Yeli
Wang Weilin as Mozang Heiyun (Black Cloud)
The sister in law of Empress Yeli, but later became the lover of the King. 
Zhao Lei as Crown Prince Haerdun
The King's son by Empress Yeli. A man who has ambitions to defeat the rival country, but is constantly overshadowed by his father and brother. He falls in love with Liu Xiyin. 
Zhang Junming as Prince Yinuo
The King's younger son. He is the most ambitious and powerful man in the country. 
Gao Shuang as Yeli Yuqi
The most powerful general in the country.

Others
Liu Weihua as Prime Minister Lü
Mou Fengbin as General Liu
Liu Jinshan as Officer Liu
Zheng Xiaodong as Hai Weining
A minister in charge of imperial examinations.
Guo Yiyang as Little Guizi
The Empress Dowager's confidante. 
Wang Yidan as Hong Erniang
Jin Liting as Hong Qiang
A prostitute who was saved by Fan Zhongyan and becomes his loyal follower. 
Wang Danni as Hong Ying
Feng Mian as Old Madam He 
Liu Kaifei as Bai Lang
Shao Wen as Lu Zhenting

Soundtrack

Production
Notable cast members of the series include Emi Wada as the costume designer, Hidetaka Ozawa as production designer and Lu Hao Ji Ji of Go Princess Go as art director.

The series was filmed at various places such as Inner Mongolia, Gansu and Ningxia from October 2016 to April 2017.

Awards and nominations

Spin-off
Three web films were produced as a continuation of the television series, which focused on the supporting characters' side stories.
 Elysium, featuring Qiu Hua. 
 Lovers Across Space, featuring Liu Xiyin.
 Mysterious Case of Furong, featuring Gao Yuanjing.

References

Television shows based on Chinese novels
2017 Chinese television series debuts
Chinese romantic comedy television series
Television series set in the Northern Song
Chinese web series
Youku original programming
2017 web series debuts